Bole is a district of Addis Ababa, Ethiopia. As of 2011 its population was of 328,900.

Geography
The district is located in the southeastern suburb of the city. It borders with the districts of Yeka, Kirkos, Nifas Silk-Lafto and Akaky Kaliti.

List of places
 Bole Arabsa
 Ayat Condominium
 Ayat Zone 2
 Ayat Zone 3
 Ayat Zone 5
 BlockLHS
 BlockRHS
 Chefie Condominium
 Flintstone Homes Condominium
 Jackros Condominium
 Natan Feleke Kibret Residence
 Noah Real Estate

Admin Level: 11
 Bole Lemi Industrial Park
 Bole Mikael
 Gerji
 Gewasa
 Ghiliffalegn Stream
 Kotebe
 Kotebe Shet
 Rwanda
 Tafo Shet
 Urael
 Woreda 11 Administrative Office
 Yeka Bole Bota

See also
Bole International Airport

References

External links

Districts of Addis Ababa